Cristina Stamate (8 February 1946 – 27 November 2017) was a Romanian actress.

Life
Stamate was born in Bucharest. She credited her older brothers with having fostered her interest in the theatre, by taking her to plays and opera when she was a child.

Having initially studied law, she graduated from Institute of Theatre and Film Arts (IATC) in 1967. Best known as a stage actress, she spent most of her career at the Teatrul de Revistă Constantin Tănase in Bucharest, where she became part of the company after first working in theatre at Arad. She was married to actor Dan Ivănescu in 1966, at the age of twenty, but they had no children and divorced in 1977; she never remarried.

In 2007, she published a cookbook, Sarea în bucate. Reţete culinare inedite; Friends stated that she had suffered from serious depression in latter years, after undergoing open heart surgery in January 2015.

In her final interview, she referred to experiences such as the deaths of her parents and her brother, and said that she had gone on acting despite personal mourning. She also expressed regret at not having had children.

Death
Stamate died at Floreasca Hospital, Bucharest, aged 71, after being admitted four days previously, on 23 November, for tests after suffering a stroke. On the day of her death, she learned of  her friend, actress Stela Popescu, had died four days earlier.

Films
Grabeste-te încet (1981)
The Secret of Bacchus (1984)

Television
O seara la Revista (2013)

Theatre
Teatrul de Revistă Constantin Tănase
Arca lui Nae și Vasile
Bufonii regelui
Dai un ban, dar face
Idolul femeilor
Nimic despre papagali
Poftă bună lui Tănase
Revista revistelor
Te aștept diseară pe Lipscani
Ura... și la gară
Vara nu-i ca iarna

References

External links

 

1946 births
2017 deaths
20th-century Romanian actresses
21st-century Romanian actresses
Actresses from Bucharest
Romanian film actresses
Romanian stage actresses
Romanian television actresses